Master of Thunder, also known as Legend of Seven Monks or , is a 2006 Japanese martial-arts film starring Sonny Chiba.

Plot
For 1400 years, Spiritual Guardians have watched over the mountains of Japan and defeated the evil spirits there. The nearby Kikyo Temple is rumored to have been the home of these legendary Guardians known as the "Blue Seven Dragons." Only two survivors of the long battle between good and evil remain, the martial monks Santoku (Yasuaki Kurata) & Genryu (Sonny Chiba). Now the fate of the world must be decided once and for all in a final ferocious battle between the force of good and evil.

External links
 
  

2006 films
2000s Japanese-language films
2006 action films
Japanese martial arts films
2006 martial arts films
2000s Japanese films